Vince Guaraldi with the San Francisco Boys Chorus is an album collaboration between American jazz pianist Vince Guaraldi and the San Francisco Boys Chorus released in December 1967. It was Guaraldi's ninth studio album and the first to be released on his D&D record label (the only one during his lifetime), named for the first initials of his two children, David and Dia.

Background
Unable to secure new recording contracts with other labels due to an ongoing legal dispute with Fantasy Records dating back to early 1966, Guaraldi opted to create his own record label, titled D&D Records (named after his children, David and Dia). The debut single, a cover of The Beatles' "Eleanor Rigby", was backed by a complete version of "Peppermint Patty" which had been featured in the most recent Peanuts television special, You're in Love, Charlie Brown (1967). The latter song was purposely chosen by Guaraldi, as he understood that the popularity of his Peanuts compositions would help sell D&D's inaugural release.

Guaraldi then proceeded to record additional tracks for what would become Vince Guaraldi with the San Francisco Boys Chorus. A conscious decision was made to divide the songs evenly between traditional jazz combos and collaborations with the San Francisco Boys Chorus. 

Due to the great expense of producing and pressing the album, Guaraldi opted to record the album in mono as a cost-saving measure, despite the music industry's ongoing transition to stereo format.

Critical reception
Guaraldi historian Derrick Bang noted that the album "has something of an identity crisis; although all eight cuts are presented in the breezy shuffle style that made [Guaraldi] famous, half the tracks employ the San Francisco Boys Chorus for background coloring, while the others are conventional instrumentals with various quartets."

Track listing

Original 1967 vinyl release

2005 CD release

Personnel 
Credits adapted from 2005 CD liner notes.

 Vince Guaraldi – piano
 Eddie Duran – guitar 
 Tom Beeson – double bass 
 Kelly Bryan – double bass 
 Roland Haynes – double bass 
 Lee Charlton – drums 
 John Rae – drums 
 San Francisco Boys Chorus – vocals 

Vince Guaraldi Consort (aka The Vince Guaraldi Sextet)
Vince Guaraldi – piano 
John Gray – guitar 
Frank Rosolino – trombone 
Ronald Lang – woodwinds 
Monty Budwig – double bass 
John Rae – drums 
John Scott Trotter – arranger and conductor

References

External links
 

1967 albums
Vince Guaraldi albums
Albums arranged by Vince Guaraldi
Peanuts music